Philip Levy may refer to:
 Philip Levy (historian), American historian and archaeologist
 Philip Levy (cricketer), South African cricketer
 Philip Marcus Levy, British psychologist